Choggu-Yapalsi is a community in Sagnarigu District in the Northern Region of Ghana. It is a nucleated but populated community located along the Tamale-Kumbungu road having Jisonaayili, Gurugu and Choggu Mmanaayili as its immediate neighbors.

See also
Suburbs of Tamale (Ghana) metropolis

References 

Communities in Ghana
Suburbs of Tamale, Ghana